Hugh Harper Lorimer (born 11 November 1896) was a Scottish footballer who played for St Mirren Juniors, Tottenham Hotspur, Dundee, Boston Soccer Club and J&P Coats.

Football career 
Harper played for St Mirren Juniors before joining Tottenham Hotspur in 1919. The outside right played a total of five matches for the Spurs between 1919–21. After leaving White Hart Lane he had a spell at Dundee before joining the American Soccer League club Boston Soccer Club dubbed the "Wonder Workers" and later J&P Coats.

External links
Postcard of Lorimer

References 

1896 births
Footballers from Paisley, Renfrewshire
Scottish footballers
Tottenham Hotspur F.C. players
Dundee F.C. players
Boston Soccer Club players
J&P Coats players
American Soccer League (1921–1933) players
Year of death missing
Association football wingers
Scottish expatriate footballers
Expatriate soccer players in the United States
Scottish expatriate sportspeople in the United States